The 2016–17 NCAA Division I men's ice hockey season began in October 2016 and ended with the 2017 NCAA Division I men's ice hockey tournament's championship game in April 2017. This was the 70th season in which an NCAA ice hockey championship was held, and the 123rd year overall in which an NCAA school iced a team.

Polls

Regular season

Standings

2017 NCAA tournament

Note: * denotes overtime period(s)

Player stats

Scoring leaders

GP = Games played; G = Goals; A = Assists; Pts = Points; PIM = Penalty minutes

Leading goaltenders
The following goaltenders lead the NCAA in goals against average while playing at least 33% of their team's total minutes.

GP = Games played; Min = Minutes played; W = Wins; L = Losses; T = Ties; GA = Goals against; SO = Shutouts; SV% = Save percentage; GAA = Goals against average

Awards

NCAA

Atlantic Hockey

Big Ten

ECAC

Hockey East

NCHC

WCHA

Hobey Baker Award

Mike Richter Award

See also
 2016–17 NCAA Division II men's ice hockey season
 2016–17 NCAA Division III men's ice hockey season

References

 
NCAA